Beth Parker may refer to:
Beth L. Parker, Canadian scientist
Elizabeth Tracy Mae "Bethe" Wettlaufer (née Parker) (born 1967), Canadian serial killer